André Luge (born 8 February 1991) is a German footballer who plays as a winger for DJK Vilzing.

Career
Born in Chemnitz, Luge made his professional debut in the German 3. Liga for Carl Zeiss Jena against FC Bayern Munich II on 21 August 2010, as a substitute for Torsten Ziegner.

In June 2013, he signed for 3. Liga side RB Leipzig. He played his debut match in a 3–2 win against 1. FC Saarbrücken on 30 November 2013. He joined SV Elversberg on loan in July 2014.

In 2015 he transferred to SSV Jahn Regensburg. As his contract was not extended and he wanted not to move too far away from Regensburg, he joined DJK Vilzing on a free transfer in summer 2017.

References

External links
 

1991 births
Living people
German footballers
FC Carl Zeiss Jena players
Sportspeople from Chemnitz
Chemnitzer FC players
Association football midfielders
FSV Zwickau players
RB Leipzig players
SV Elversberg players
SSV Jahn Regensburg players
3. Liga players
Regionalliga players
Footballers from Saxony